Mekseb Debesay Abrha (born 16 June 1991) is an Eritrean racing cyclist, who last rode for UCI Continental team . He rode at the 2014 UCI Road World Championships, as well as the 2015 UCI Road World Championships, where he was the only rider from Eritrea to compete in the men's elite road race. He won the 2014 Tour d'Algérie.

Major results

2011
 1st Stage 5 Tour of Eritrea
2012
 1st Stage 5 Tour of Eritrea
2013
 1st  Overall Tour of Eritrea
1st Young rider classification
 3rd Overall Fenkel Northern Redsea
1st Stage 1
2014
 1st  Overall Tour d'Algérie
1st Points classification
1st Stage 4
 1st  Overall Grand Prix Chantal Biya
1st  Young rider classification
1st  African rider classification
1st Stage 4
 Tour of Rwanda
1st Mountains classification
1st Stages 1 & 6
 2nd Time trial, National Road Championships
 2nd Critérium International de Sétif
 2nd Critérium International de Blida
 4th Overall Tour International de Sétif
1st Points classification
1st Stage 3
 7th Critérium International d'Alger
 8th Overall Tour de Blida
2015
 1st  Team time trial, African Road Championships
 1st  Overall Tour de Blida
1st Points classification
1st Stage 1
 1st Critérium International de Sétif
 Tour of Rwanda
1st Stages 1 & 4
 2nd Critérium International de Blida
 3rd Circuit d'Alger
 6th Overall Tour International de Sétif
1st Stage 3
 6th Overall Tour du Faso
1st Stage 8
 10th Overall Tour International de la Wilaya d'Oran
2016
 3rd  Road race, African Road Championships
2017
 1st  Time trial, National Road Championships
 5th Overall Tour de Langkawi
1st Stage 4
 10th Overall Tour of Guangxi
2018
 African Road Championships
1st  Team time trial
1st  Time trial
4th Road race
2019
 African Road Championships
1st  Team time trial
1st  Road race
4th Time trial
 5th Time trial, National Road Championships
2021
 2nd Time trial, National Road Championships

References

External links

1991 births
Living people
Eritrean male cyclists
Sportspeople from Asmara